Constantia Jones (1708 – 22 December 1738) was a prostitute in London, which was then part of the Kingdom of Great Britain, during the term of Prime Minister Robert Walpole. She was sentenced to hang for stealing 36 shillings and a half-guinea from one of her clients.

Conviction 
Based on this testimony, Jones was sentenced to hang at Tyburn.

Jones, who had been sent to the notorious prison at Newgate some twenty times before, was 30 years old upon her execution. Historian Peter Linebaugh asserts that regardless of her guilt or innocence, her conviction on such flimsy evidence indicates the bias of 18th-century English courts against the trade of prostitution and those who worked in the industry. Although officially London courts took all persons as equally worthy, class distinctions were still operative, and therefore testimony from a "gentleman," in particular, would weigh heavily against that of a prostitute. Jones would have been a weak defendant, as she had been in Newgate on multiple occasions.

References

Sources
 
 
 

1708 births
1738 deaths
18th-century English women
18th-century English people
English female prostitutes
Crime in London
Executed English people
People executed for theft
Executed people from London
Executed English women
People executed by the Kingdom of Great Britain
People executed by England and Wales by hanging
People executed at Tyburn